Alfred Ollerup Jørgensen (30 August 1890 – 26 November 1973) was a Danish gymnast who competed in the 1920 Summer Olympics. He was part of the Danish team, which was able to win the silver medal in the gymnastics men's team, Swedish system event in 1920.

References

1890 births
1973 deaths
Danish male artistic gymnasts
Gymnasts at the 1920 Summer Olympics
Olympic gymnasts of Denmark
Olympic silver medalists for Denmark
Olympic medalists in gymnastics
Medalists at the 1920 Summer Olympics